Miguel Avila is a retired Colombian-American soccer forward who played professionally in the North American Soccer League and American Soccer League.

Avila attended Santa Clara University where he set several men's soccer scoring records.  In 1980, he signed with the Atlanta Chiefs of the North American Soccer League.  He played only the 1980-1981 NASL indoor season before moving to the San Jose Earthquakes for the 1981-1982 NASL indoor season.  He also played for the Carolina Lightnin' of the American Soccer League.

Avila later served as a referee for American Professional Soccer League games.

References

External links
 NASL stats

1958 births
Living people
American soccer players
American soccer referees
American Soccer League (1933–1983) players
Atlanta Chiefs players
Carolina Lightnin' players
Colombian emigrants to the United States
North American Soccer League (1968–1984) indoor players
San Jose Earthquakes (1974–1988) players
Santa Clara Broncos men's soccer players
American sportspeople of Colombian descent
Association football forwards
Sportspeople from Cartagena, Colombia